Quarter Moon in a Ten Cent Town is the fifth studio album by American country music artist Emmylou Harris, released in 1978. The album reached number 3 on the Billboard charts, with three charting singles: "To Daddy" (written by Dolly Parton) at #3, "Two More Bottles of Wine" at #1 (the third #1 of Harris' career), and "Easy From Now On" (co-written by Carlene Carter, and the song from which the album's title comes) at #12. Also featured are "One Paper Kid", a duet with Willie Nelson, "Leaving Louisiana in the Broad Daylight", which the Oak Ridge Boys would reach #1 with in 1980 and "I Ain't Living Long Like This", which Waylon Jennings would reach #1 with in 1980 as well.   The painting used for the album cover is by Susanna Clark.

Track listing

Personnel
Brian Ahern - acoustic guitar, 12-string guitar, gut-String guitar, percussion, baby bottle
Dianne Brooks - backing vocals
James Burton - electric guitar
Rodney Crowell - acoustic guitar, electric guitar
Rick Danko - fiddle, backing vocals
Hank DeVito - pedal steel
Emory Gordy Jr. - bass
Glen Hardin - piano, electric piano, string arrangements
Emmylou Harris - vocals, acoustic guitar
Garth Hudson - accordion, baritone saxophone
Nicolette Larson - backing vocals
Albert Lee - acoustic guitar, electric guitar, piano, mandolin
Willie Nelson - duet vocals
Mickey Raphael - harmonica
Ricky Skaggs - fiddle, viola
John Ware - drums, percussion

Technical
Brian Ahern - Producer, Engineer
Donivan Cowart - Engineer
Bradley Hartman - Engineer
Michael Hollyfield - design
Ed Thrasher - photography

References

Emmylou Harris Quarter Moon in a Ten Cent Town liner notes

Emmylou Harris albums
1978 albums
Albums produced by Brian Ahern (producer)
Warner Records albums